Federico Coria was the defending champion but lost in the first round to Dalibor Svrčina.

Vít Kopřiva won the title after defeating Svrčina 6–2, 6–2 in the final.

Seeds

Draw

Finals

Top half

Bottom half

References

External links
Main draw
Qualifying draw

UniCredit Czech Open - 1
2022 Singles